Michael Cheng Tak-kin, JP (born 1938) was the member of the Legislative Council of Hong Kong and Wong Tai Sin District Board.

Biography
Born in Hong Kong, Michael Cheng studied at the La Salle College in his youth. Cheng obtained his bachelor's degree in History and Political Science from the University of Hong Kong and master's degree in education from the Chinese University of Hong Kong. He was the principal of the Po Leung Kuk CFA No.1 College.

He was first elected as the Wong Tai Sin District Board member in 1985, representing the residents in Tsz Wan Shan (later representing the Tsz Wan East constituency), and continually served in the Board through the transfer of the sovereignty until his retirement in 2007. In 1988 election, he defeated the pro-democracy incumbent Conrad Lam from the Wong Tai Sin electoral college constituency consisting of members of the Wong Tai Sin District Board.

Cheng's political stance was considered conservative. On the legislation of the Hong Kong Bill of Rights Ordinance in 1990, he worried that the Bill would provide the protection for the criminals and made the police difficult to maintain law and order. In 1990, he became the member of the pro-business conservative Liberal Democratic Federation of Hong Kong. As the electoral college was to be abolished and replaced by directly elected seats in the 1991 Legislative Council election, Cheng decided not to seek for re-election.

He later on became member of the Hong Kong Progressive Alliance when the Liberal Democratic Federation was merged into it in the late 1990s, and the Democratic Alliance for the Betterment and Progress of Hong Kong when the two parties merged in 2005. He retired from the Wong Tai Sin District Council in 2007.

References

1938 births
Living people
Hong Kong educators
District councillors of Wong Tai Sin District
Alumni of the University of Hong Kong
Alumni of the Chinese University of Hong Kong
Progressive Hong Kong Society politicians
Liberal Democratic Federation of Hong Kong politicians
Hong Kong Progressive Alliance politicians
Democratic Alliance for the Betterment and Progress of Hong Kong politicians
HK LegCo Members 1988–1991